James Findlay Stewart (16 April 1884 – 4 February 1951) was an Australian rules footballer who played with St Kilda and Carlton in the Victorian Football League (VFL).

Stewart was a wingman in North Melbourne's 1903 Victorian Football Association premiership team and was also a member of the side which were awarded the premiership the following year. Although Carlton tried recruiting him, Stewart opted to join St Kilda in 1905. He was used as a centreman originally but ended up spending most of his time on a half forward flank and topped St Kilda's goal-kicking in both 1907 and 1908, with 21 and 28 goals respectively. His best effort in 1907 was a seven-goal haul in a win over Geelong at Corio Oval, breaking the club record, which had stood at four goals. He returned to North Melbourne in 1911 and then spent a season with Carlton.

References

1884 births
Australian rules footballers from Victoria (Australia)
St Kilda Football Club players
Carlton Football Club players
North Melbourne Football Club (VFA) players
1951 deaths